Mervyn "Merv" John Hicks (born 1943) is a Welsh former rugby union, and professional rugby league footballer who played in the 1960s and 1970s. He played rugby union club football in Wales for the Cross Keys RFC, rugby league club football in Britain for Doncaster (Heritage № 179), Warrington (Heritage № 623), St Helens (Heritage № 818), Hull FC, Leeds and Bradford Northern, and in Australia for the Canterbury Bulldogs (Heritage № 317) and the North Sydney Bears (Heritage № 673). Hicks was also selected to play representative football for Great Britain, Commonwealth XIII and Lancashire.

Background
Hicks was born in Crosskeys, Monmouthshire, Wales.

Early career 
After representing Wales Youth Rugby Union as number 8 and captain in 1960 (in the same team as David Watkins), he was 'lured north' to play rugby league for Doncaster (3 appearances 1961) for the sum of £1000, enough to buy several houses in his home village at that time. At 6'2" and 17 stones, his dynamic skills, aggressive defence and size caught the eye of Warrington (28 appearances 1961–64), who paid Doncaster £6000 just a few months later to sign him. He played his last match for Warrington on Saturday 8 February 1964. 

He then moved onto St. Helens (67 appearances 1964-1966) starring in one of the all-time great packs alongside legends such as Ray French, Cliff Watson, and fellow Welshmen Kel Coslett, John Warlow and John Mantle, and also winning selection for Commonwealth XIII and full caps for Great Britain.

Merv Hicks represented the Commonwealth XIII rugby league team while at St. Helens in 1965 against New Zealand at Crystal Palace National Recreation Centre, London on Wednesday 18 August 1965,

County Cup Final appearances
Merv Hicks played left-, i.e. number 11, and scored a try in St. Helens' 12-4 victory over Swinton in the 1964 Lancashire County Cup Final during the 1964–65 season at Central Park, Wigan on Saturday 24 October 1964.

BBC2 Floodlit Trophy Final appearances
Merv Hicks played left-, i.e. number 11, in St. Helens' 0-4 defeat by Castleford in the 1965 BBC2 Floodlit Trophy Final during the 1965–66 season at Knowsley Road, St. Helens on Tuesday 14 December 1965.

Representative honours
On 3 April 1965, Hicks played in the first ever Great Britain under-24 international match in a 17–9 win against France under-24's.

New life and career in Australia 
The offer to start a new life with the Canterbury Bankstown Berries in the Sydney Rugby League competition led Hicks to Australia with his wife, Gwyneira, and Andrew, in 1966. Two daughters, Julie and Tanya, followed in 1967 and 1970.

Five highly successful seasons with the Berries (84 appearances) including a grand final in 1967 ended with his move to the North Sydney Bears (19 appearances) as captain-coach for the 1971 and 1972 seasons. Although these were lean times for the Bears and an injury stricken Hicks, they managed to beat all of the finalists of those years when Hicks was on the field, as well as creating many headlines with the hard-hitting antics of the captain and his fellow Welsh import, 'Big' Jim Mills. His 7 seasons in the Sydney competition were highlighted by an ultimately unsuccessful newspaper campaign to have the international representation rules changed so that he could be picked for New South Wales and Australia, such was his dominance at club level.

A short season with the Orange CYMS (16 appearances) in country NSW had sufficient impact on the district that he was nominated for the club's "Team of the Century", prior to the Hicks family's return to the north of England.

Later career 
Hicks returned to the north of England for four seasons to finish off his first class career with Hull FC (18 appearances), Leeds (11 appearances) and Bradford Northern (2 appearances). Having played in an era when Wales was not represented on the international stage during his first stint in British rugby league, his selection for Wales for the 1975 Rugby League World Cup was cruelly denied by a broken arm suffered in a club game just weeks before the tournament kicked off. Nineteen seasons of professional rugby league ended for Hicks with three years at the Bowral Blues (40 appearances) in Group 6 of the New South Wales country rugby league.

Coaching career 
After retiring from playing, he coached several teams including Bowral, Group 6, Southern Division, Junee and Riverina in the country championships.

Hicks now lives with his wife Gwyneira, on the Central Coast of New South Wales and works in the hotel industry.

References

External links
!Great Britain Statistics at englandrl.co.uk (statistics currently missing due to not having appeared for both Great Britain, and England)
(archived by web.archive.org) Merv Hicks at yesterdayshero.com.au
Profile at saints.org.uk

1943 births
Living people
Bradford Bulls players
Canterbury-Bankstown Bulldogs players
Cross Keys RFC players
Doncaster R.L.F.C. players
Great Britain national rugby league team players
Hull F.C. players
Lancashire rugby league team players
Leeds Rhinos players
North Sydney Bears coaches
North Sydney Bears players
Rugby articles needing expert attention
Rugby league centres
Rugby league players from Caerphilly County Borough
Rugby league props
Rugby league second-rows
Rugby union number eights
Rugby union players from Crosskeys
St Helens R.F.C. players
Warrington Wolves players
Welsh rugby league coaches
Welsh rugby league players
Welsh rugby union players